Luck of the Corpse is the first album from the death metal band Deceased. The cover is an image from the 1963 film Black Sabbath.

Track listing

Credits
Mark Adams - guitar
Doug Souther - guitar
Les Snyder - bass
King Fowley - drums, vocals

Other Credits
Mike Smith - Guitar (pictured but does not play on the album)
Frank Marchand - Engineer, Mixing
Joe Scorza - Photos

Deceased (band) albums
1991 debut albums